Ulva lactuca, also known by the common name sea lettuce, is an edible green alga in the family Ulvaceae. It is the type species of the genus Ulva. A synonym is U. fenestrata, referring to its "windowed" or "holed" appearance.

Description
Ulva lactuca is a thin flat green alga growing from a discoid holdfast. The margin is somewhat ruffled and often torn. The membrane is two cells thick, soft and translucent, and grows attached, without a stipe, to rocks or other algae by a small disc-shaped holdfast.<ref name="Burrows 91">{{Cite book|author=Burrows, E.M.|year=1991|title=Seaweeds of the British Isles|volume=2|publisher=Natural History Museum|place= London|isbn=978-0-565-00981-6}}</ref>

Green to dark green in colour, this species in the Chlorophyta is formed of two layers of cells irregularly arranged, as seen in cross-section. The chloroplast is cup-shaped in some references but as a parietal plate in others with one to three pyrenoids. There are other species of Ulva which are similar and not always easy to differentiate.

Distribution
The distribution is worldwide: Europe, North America (west and east coasts), Central America, Caribbean Islands, South America, Africa, Indian Ocean Islands, South-west Asia, China, Pacific Islands, Australia and New Zealand.

EcologyUlva lactuca is very common on rocks and on other algae in the littoral and sublittoral on shores all around the British Isles, the coast of France, the Low Countries and up to Denmark. It is particularly prolific in areas where nutrients are abundant. This has been the case off the coast of Brittany where a high level of nitrates, from the intensive farming there, washes out to sea. The result is that large quantities of Ulva lactuca are washed up on beaches, where their decay produces methane, hydrogen sulfide, and other gases.

Certain environmental conditions can lead to the algae spreading over large areas. In August 2009, unprecedented levels of the algae washed up on the beaches of Brittany, France, causing a major public health scare as it decomposed. The rotting thalli produced large quantities of hydrogen sulfide, a toxic gas which, like hydrogen cyanide, inhibits cytochrome c oxidase, inhibiting cellular respiration and resulting in critical cellular hypoxia. In one incident near Saint-Michel-en-Grève, a horse rider lost consciousness and his horse died after breathing the seaweed fumes. Environmentalists blamed the phenomenon on excessive use of fertilizers and the excretion of nitrates by pig and poultry farmers. In an earlier separate incident at the same beach in July 2009, a truck driver had died near his vehicle after hauling three truckloads of sea lettuce without protective gear during the annual cleanup. Although initially recorded as a heart attack, the death of the truck driver prompted French authorities to exhume his remains for an autopsy. It was later determined to be cardiac arrest resulting from pulmonary edema, which is an indication of possible hydrogen sulfide poisoning. Dead animals found on the algae-clogged beaches (including thirty-one wild boars in July 2011) were also claimed to be linked to toxic fumes by environmentalists.

Life history
The sporangial and gametangial thalli are morphologically alike. The diploid adult plant produces haploid zoospores by meiosis, these settle and grow to form haploid male and female plants similar to the diploid plants. When these haploid plants release gametes they unite to produce the zygote which germinates, and grows to produce the diploid plant.

UsesU. lactuca is locally used in Scotland in soups and salads.
 In Hawaiʻi, U. lactuca is also called limu pālahala and eaten in different ways: mixed with other algae, salted and served with raw fish, boiled in water and served as a soup, or served with chili pepper, onions, soy sauce and sugar. Additionally, U. lactuca has traditional uses in Hawaiʻi as fertilizer and as adornment for hula. When U. lactuca is used for hula it is called limu pāpahapaha.

References

Further reading
 Hayden, H.S., Blomster, J., Maggs, C.A., Silva, P.C., Stanhope, M.J. and Waaland, J.R. (2003) "Linnaeus was right all along: Ulva and Enteromorpha are not distinct genera" European Journal of Phycology'' 38: pp. 277–294,

External links
 Ulva lactuca, AlgaeBase entry
 Ulva lactuca, University of Rhode Island

Edible seaweeds
Ulvaceae
Algae of Australia
Plants described in 1753
Taxa named by Carl Linnaeus